Belosselsky-Belozersky may refer to:
 Belosselsky-Belozersky family
 Sergei Belosselsky-Belozersky
 Constantine Esperovich Beloselsky-Belozersky
 Prince Belozersky
 Beloselsky-Belozersky Palace